Anna Maria Mokgethi is a Motswana politician serving as the Minister of Nationality, Immigration and Gender Affairs since November 2019.  She is the Member of Parliament for Gaborone Bonnington North. Mokgethi is a member of the Botswana Democratic Party.

Political career
Mokgethi was originally a member of the Botswana Congress Party, before she resigned to join the Botswana Democratic Party. Ahead of the 2019 general election, she was selected as the BDP's candidate for Gaborone Bonnington North. She easily defeated opposition leader Duma Boko on 23 October after she received 3,033 votes compared to Boko's 1,851 votes. She was sworn in as an MP on 5 November 2019.

On 6 November 2019, president Mokgweetsi Masisi appointed Mokgethi Minister of Nationality, Immigration and Gender Affairs. She was sworn in on the same day and succeeded Dorcas Makgato-Malesu.

Personal life
Her daughter, Sarona Motlhagodi, known professionally as Sasa Klaas, died on 6 March 2021 in a helicopter crash.

References

Living people
Year of birth missing (living people)
Members of the National Assembly (Botswana)
Botswana Democratic Party politicians
21st-century women politicians
People from Gaborone